Diabaté Fatoumata Guindo (born June 28, 1973) is a politician in Mali.

Guindo was Mali's minister in charge of relations with institutions and government spokesperson from 2007 to 2011.

References

Living people
21st-century Malian politicians
1973 births
Place of birth missing (living people)